Clark Township is an inactive township in Lincoln County, in the U.S. state of Missouri.

Clark Township was established in 1826, and named after Chrisopher Clark, a first settler.

References

Townships in Missouri
Townships in Lincoln County, Missouri